Sinfra was a cargo ship built in 1929 as Fernglen by Akers Mekaniske Verksted in Oslo, Norway, for a Norwegian shipping company. The ship was sold to Swedish owners in 1934 and to a French company in 1939, on the last occasion having her name changed to Sinfra.

Sinfra was confiscated by German authorities in 1942, and used by them in the Mediterranean. On 19 October 1943, Sinfra was bombed and sunk by Allied aircraft north of Souda Bay, Crete. Around 2,000 people were killed in the sinking, the majority being Italian POWs.

Description
She had yard number 434.

She had electric lighting, wireless telegraph and two decks. Each of the engines, also built by Akers Mekaniske Verksted, powered a screw propeller.

History

Fernglen was launched on 15 May 1929, and completed in July of the same year. She was built for A/S Glittre of Oslo, Norway (a subsidiary of the shipping company Fearnley & Eger). The ship was assigned the code letters LHKB. While Fernglen was under construction, Norwegian painter Thorolf Holmboe visited the shipyard and painted the scene. The maritime painting  portrays Fernglen under construction, as well as the Fred. Olsen & Co. cargo ship  undergoing maintenance in the neighbouring floating dry dock at Akers Mekaniske Verksted.

Fernglen was one of nine ships belonging to Fearnley & Eger that formed the "Fern Line". The Fern Line ships were employed primarily in liner trade, carrying phosphate and cotton to Japan, then sailing from the Philippines to the United States with cargoes of copra.

The British tug  and the Dutch passenger ship  went to her aid. The British tug  was sent from Suez, Egypt on 22 August to assist Preserver. Fernglen was refloated on 8 November and taken in to Ras Alula, Italian Somaliland for examination. The necessity of discharging her cargo by hand was the main factor in the delay in refloating her. The damage caused by the grounding was such that the ship was considered beyond economic repair. The refloated wreck was towed to Rotterdam in the Netherlands.

In 1934 the wreck of Fernglen was nevertheless sold to the Stockholm-based company Rederi A/B Jamaica, repaired and renamed Sandhamn. The repairs and rebuild work on the ship was carried out at Öresundsvarvet at Landskrona and entailed the replacement of 600 tons of steel and the complete disassembly and refurbishing of the ship's machinery. Öresund Shipyard's work on rebuilding the ship was one of the largest hull repair jobs ever carried out in Sweden at the time. The rebuilding was completed on 5 December 1934. The vessel was assigned the code letters SEVA. Rederi Jamaica employed Sandhamn on trade lines abroad. In 1939 she was sold on to Cie Generale de Nav a Vapeur Cyprien Fabre of Marseille, France. The new French owners renamed her Sinfra.

In December 1942, the German occupiers of France confiscated the ship. They retained the French name of the vessel. Management of the ship was transferred to the German semi-public , which managed all civilian ships confiscated by the Germans in the Mediterranean.

Transporting prisoners of war
The Greek island of Crete had been captured by the Germans and Italians in the Battle of Crete in May 1941 and was occupied by a mixed German-Italian force. The Italian garrison unit was the 51st Siena Infantry Division, consisting of 21,700 men, which occupied the easternmost prefecture of Lasithi.

On 8 September 1943 the Armistice between Italy and Allied armed forces was signed, and the Italians in Crete and elsewhere were disarmed by the Germans without major resistance. As elsewhere, they were given the choice to continue the war alongside Germany or to be sent to the Reich to perform forced labour. The Germans employed ships to transport Italian prisoners in the Mediterranean. Of these a dozen were lost, causing the deaths of at least 13,000 prisoners in total.

A minority of the Italian soldiers on Crete chose to continue the fight on the German side and formed the Legione Italiana Volontaria Creta.

Sinking
On 18 October 1943, 2,389 Italian prisoners were loaded into the cargo hold of Sinfra to be transported to Piraeus on the Greek mainland. There were 204 Germans on board the ship, as well as a cargo of bombs. Less than an hour after departing Souda Bay, accompanied by the escort vessels GK 05 and GK 06, the ship came under Allied air attack. At 22:05, after nightfall, Sinfra was struck by a torpedo near the front hatch, and at 23:00 the ship was hit by a bomb that penetrated the engine room. The hits knocked out the ship's steering and set Sinfra on fire. At 02:31 on 19 October, the ship blew up and sank. Most of those who died in the sinking were Italian POWs. The number of dead is disputed, with estimates ranging from 1,857 or 2,098 killed, up to 5,000 dead. Amongst the survivors were 597 Italians, 197 Germans and 13 Greeks. Some 3% of the Germans on board died in the sinking, while according to conservative estimates close to 77% of the Italians perished.

The ship had insufficient safety equipment in relation to the number of people on board. In addition to the two escort vessels, eleven other German vessels responded to the SOS signals sent out by Sinfra. The rescue vessels were under orders to prioritize the rescue of Germans. While rescue efforts were going on, a No. 603 Squadron RAF Bristol Beaufighter strafed a German Dornier Do 24 flying boat which was participating in the rescue. The Do 24 later sank. As Sinfra burned, the German guards on board locked the prisoners in the holds and threw hand grenades at them. When the panicking surviving prisoners broke out of the holds and charged the guards, attempting to board life boats, the guards opened fire with small arms and machine guns, killing many. According to Italian naval archives, some 500 Italians were rescued from the sinking ship, but after the survivors had been brought to Chania, Crete, about half of them were executed "for undisciplined behaviour ... and the killing of guards" during the sinking.

References
Notes

Citations

Bibliography
 
 
 
 
 
 

1929 ships
Ships built in Oslo
Merchant ships of Norway
Maritime incidents in 1933
Merchant ships of Sweden
World War II merchant ships of France
World War II merchant ships of Germany
1943 in Greece
Crete in World War II
Maritime incidents in October 1943
Germany–Italy relations
Ships sunk by US aircraft
Ships sunk by British aircraft
World War II shipwrecks in the Mediterranean Sea